The Convent and church of Carmelitas (Spanish: Convento de Carmelitas y la Iglesia) is a convent located in Liétor, Spain. It was declared Bien de Interés Cultural in 1981.

References 

Churches in Castilla–La Mancha
Bien de Interés Cultural landmarks in the Province of Albacete
Convents in Spain